The Valea lui Vasile is a left tributary of the river Topa in Romania. It flows into the Topa near the village Hidișel.

References

Rivers of Romania
Rivers of Bihor County